Nýdönsk (alternatively Ný dønsk or Ný dönsk, literally New Danish) is an Icelandic musical group established in 1987 by Daníel Ágúst Haraldsson, Björn Jörundur Friðbjörnsson, Ólafur Hólm Einarsson, Einar Sigurðsson and Valdimar Bragi Bragason with their debut album Ekki er á allt kosið released in 1989. The follow-up album Regnbogaland in 1990 signalled various changes in the line-up with some members departing and the inclusion of Jón Ólafsson and Stefán Hjörleifsson. The band has released a number of successful albums and compilations. After a hiatus, the band came back in 2007 on the 20th anniversary of the band's formation with an album Nýdönsk & Sinfó in 2008 with Sinfóníuhljómsveit Íslands, the Icelandic Symphonic Orchestra.

Members
Björn Jörundur Friðbjörnsson (1987–present)
Ólafur Hólm Einarsson (1987–present)
Einar Sigurðsson (1987-1990)
Daníel Ágúst Haraldsson (1987-1997) (2007–present)
Valdimar Bragi Bragason (1987-1989)
Jón Ólafsson (1990–present)
Stefán Hjörleifsson (1990–present)
Bergur M. Bernburg

Discography

Albums
1989: Ekki er á allt kosið
1990: Regnbogaland
1991: Kirsuber
1991: Deluxe
1992: Himnasending
1993: Hunang
1994: Gauragangur
1994: Drög að upprisu
1998: Húsmæðragarðurinn
2001: Pólfarir
2002: Freistingar
2004: Skynjun 
2007: Grænmeti og ávextir 
2008: Nýdönsk & Sinfó
2008: Turninn
2014: Diskó Berlín (Part 1)
2017: Á Plánetunni Jörð

Compilation albums
1997: Nýdönsk 1987-1997
2007: Nýdönsk 1987-2007
2012: Nýdönsk 25

Singles
2008: "Náttúran"
2009: "Ég ætla að brosa" 
2010: "Umboðsmenn drottins"
2010: "Vertu með"
2011: "Í nánd"
2013: "Where Dreams Go to Die"
2013: "Iður"
2014: "Uppvakningar"
2014: "Diskó Berlín"
2014: "Nýr maður"
2014: "Stafrófsröð"

References

Icelandic rock music groups